Back to the Basic is the first Korean-language extended play by South Korean R&B and pop singer Rain. It was his first EP two years after the release of his Korean-language studio album Rainism.
Upon the release the EP was a commercial performance and sold more than 56,000 copies in South Korea and 8,000 in Japan as of 2013. The album peaked at number 1 in on the Gaon Album Chart and number 25 on the Oricon Albums Chart.

Background
As a farewell to his fans before going for 21 months of compulsory military service, Rain toured throughout Asia including Indonesia, Japan, Korea, China, Taiwan, Hong Kong and Singapore. This was the first tour where Rain traveled throughout Korea with stops in Busan, Guangzhou, Jeju, Daegu, Daeieon and Seoul.

Reception
The EP sold over 53,584 in South Korea becoming the 22nd best-selling album of 2010. In Japan, the EP sold over 50,000. The Japanese version was released with a different cover, a Japanese version of "Love Song" and a DVD with a making of as well as the "Love Song" music video.

The Best Show Tour

As a farewell to his fans before going into the military, Rain held his fourth concert tour in Asia, titled "The Best Show Tour". The tour held shows in numerous countries including South Korea, Japan, China, Singapore, Indonesia.

Shows

Track listing

Charts

Weekly charts

Monthly charts

Notes

References

Rain (entertainer) albums
J. Tune Entertainment EPs
2010 EPs
Korean-language EPs
Japanese-language EPs